Honkey Kong may refer to:

 Honkey Kong (Apathy album), 2011
 Honkey Kong (Boots Electric album), 2011